Kerstin Spittler (born 16 December 1963) is a retired East German rower who won a gold and a silver medal in the coxed four boat class at the world championships in 1985 and 1986, respectively. In October 1986, she was awarded a Patriotic Order of Merit in gold (first class) for her sporting success. She competed at the 1988 Summer Olympics in the coxless pair, together with Katrin Schröder, and finished in fourth place.

References

1963 births
Living people
East German female rowers
Olympic rowers of East Germany
Rowers at the 1988 Summer Olympics
World Rowing Championships medalists for East Germany
Recipients of the Patriotic Order of Merit in gold